Will of the People is the ninth studio album by the English rock band Muse, released on 26 August 2022 through Warner Records and Helium-3. Self-produced by the band, it is a genre-hopping album described by Muse as "a greatest hits album – of new songs". Five singles were released from the album; "Won't Stand Down", "Compliance", "Will of the People", "Kill or Be Killed" and "You Make Me Feel Like It's Halloween".

Will of the People received generally positive reviews and became Muse's seventh consecutive UK No.1 album. The Will of the People World Tour, began in April 2022 and will continue in 2023.

Background and recording
Will of the People was recorded at Matt Bellamy's Red Room studio in Santa Monica, California, as well as Black Lodge and Abbey Road Studios in London. Warner Records said the album spans multiple genres, describing "Will of the People" as a "glam rocker" and "Kill or Be Killed" as "industrial". Frontman Matt Bellamy said it was spurred by Warner's request for a greatest hits album; instead, Muse decided to make an album that combined their previous sounds, describing it as essentially "a greatest hits album – of new songs".

Bellamy said the lyrics were inspired by "the increasing uncertainty and instability in the world [...] as the Western empire and the natural world, which have cradled us for so long, are genuinely threatened". He called Will of the People "a personal navigation through those fears".

Promotion and release
The first snippet of the album was heard on 25 December 2021, when Bellamy briefly livestreamed himself and his 10-year old son Bing listening to the song "Won't Stand Down". Almost two weeks later, the band announced the official release of the song for 13 January 2022, their first single since 2018's "Pressure". The second single from the album, "Compliance", was released on 17 March 2022, alongside the announcement of the album and its release date of 26 August 2022.

The third single off the album, "Will of the People", was released on 1 June 2022. That same month, the band began the European festival leg of their Will of the People World Tour, playing all three released singles live as well as a then-unreleased track from the album, "Kill or Be Killed". The song proved to be popular with fans, and so, on 13 July 2022, the band announced that the song would be released as the album's fourth single on 21 July 2022. On 23 August 2022, Muse announced that a fifth single from the album, "You Make Me Feel Like It's Halloween", would be released on 26 August, the same day as the album's release.

On 1 August 2022, it was announced that Will of the People could be purchased as a non-fungible token (NFT) on the "eco-friendly" Polygon-powered platform Serenade, making it one of the first new chart-eligible format in seven years, narrowly behind Aitch's first studio album, Close to Home, the chart-eligible album that was released on 19 August.

Per The Guardian: "The Muse NFT album will retail for £20 and will be limited to 1,000 copies globally. As both an NFT and a limited-edition format, it is relatively sparse in its offering. Buyers will get a downloadable version of the album – complete with different sleeve – as high-res FLAC files; the members of Muse will digitally sign it[,] and each of the 1,000 buyers will have their names permanently listed on the linked roster of purchasers."

On 25 November 2022, an alternative Italian version of "Ghosts (How Can I Move On)" is released with the Italian singer Elisa then a French version two weeks later, on 9 December, with the singer Mylène Farmer.

Critical reception

Will of the People has received generally positive reviews from critics. On Metacritic, which assigns a normalised rating out of 100 to reviews from mainstream critics, the album has received a score of 71 out of 100 based on 14 reviews, indicating "generally favourable" reviews.

Commercial performance
Will of the People debuted at number one on the UK Albums Chart, selling 51,500 units in its first week and becoming Muse's seventh UK number-one album. In the US, it debuted at number 15 on the Billboard 200, including number 1 on the Top Alternative Albums and Top Rock Albums charts with 24,000 album equivalent units. As of January 2023, Will of the People has sold over 300,000 units worldwide.

Track listing

Personnel

Muse
Matt Bellamy – lead vocals, guitar, piano, keyboards, production, engineering (all tracks); crowd vocals (track 1), art direction
Dominic Howard – drums, percussion, production, engineering (all tracks); crowd vocals (track 1), art direction
Chris Wolstenholme – bass guitar, production, engineering (all tracks); crowd vocals (track 1), art direction

Additional musicians
Bing Bellamy – crowd vocals (track 1)
Elle Bellamy – crowd vocals (track 1)
Buster Wolstenholme – crowd vocals (track 1)
Caris Wolstenholme – crowd vocals (track 1)
Ernie Wolstenholme – crowd vocals (track 1)
Indiana Wolstenholme Tolhurst – crowd vocals (track 1)
Tabitha Wolstenholme Tolhurst – crowd vocals (track 1)
Teddi Wolstenholme – crowd vocals (track 1)

Technical personnel
Bryce Bordone – mixing engineer (tracks 1–3, 5, 6, 8–10)
Tommy Bosustow – studio runner (Abbey Road Studios)
Adrian Bushby – additional engineer (track 7)
Joe Devenney – studio assistant (Red Room Studios), mix assistant (track 7)
Chris Gehringer – mastering
Şerban Ghenea – mixing (tracks 1–3, 5, 6, 8–10)
Dan Lancaster – mixing (track 4)
Andy Maxwell – studio assistant (Abbey Road Studios)
Rhys May – mixing assistant (track 4)
Aleks Von Korff – additional production, engineering, mixing (track 7)
Paul Warren – technical assistant
Chris Whitemyer – technical assistant

Other personnel
Jesse Lee Stout – creative director
Miko del Rosario – artwork
Nick Fancher – photography
Andrea "Waarp" Marcias – artwork
Tiago Marinho – cover art
Jesse Lee Stout – cover art
Tyrone Yarde – cover art

Charts

Weekly charts

Year-end charts

Certifications

References

2022 albums
Muse (band) albums
Albums impacted by the COVID-19 pandemic
Warner Records albums